"You Can't Touch Me" is a song and the second single from rapper Royce da 5'9"'s debut studio album Rock City (Version 2.0), which was released in 2002 by E1 Music (formerly "Koch Records") and Game Recordings after another record label had turned down his first version of the album.  The single was released on April 26, 2000, in CD and vinyl form.  Though not credited, "You Can't Touch Me" features various vocals on the song by Cha Cha.
The B-side for this single is "D-Elite".

Chart positions
"You Can't Touch Me" peaked at No. 66 on the Billboard Hot R&B/Hip-Hop Singles & Tracks chart in 2000.

Music video
The music video for "You Can't Touch Me" directed by Annti Jokinen starts off with Royce sleeping in his bed and awakening when the music starts. He then starts rapping, along with showing camera perspectives of numerous sleeping women in his room. As the second verse strikes, Royce appears in a dance club rapping along while the other people are dancing to the music. During the chorus, a lady from the dance club sings it. The third verse shows Royce leaving the building and walking to his car. When he reaches his car, he sees a woman waiting for him in the back seat to drive away from the building.

Track listing
CD single

External links

References

1999 songs
2000 singles
Royce da 5'9" songs
Songs written by Royce da 5'9"
Song recordings produced by Trackmasters
Songs written by Samuel Barnes (songwriter)
Songs written by Jean-Claude Olivier
MNRK Music Group singles